Reva Stone  (born 1944) is a Canadian artist known for her digital artworks. Stone's work explores how technology changes the relationship between humans and our surroundings, and how those relationships have the potential to shape our future. She fuses the concepts of performance art, made popular in the 1960s, with digital imaging and other modern forms of expression. As one of the first women to be involved in the new media arts in Canada, her large-scale projects influenced many artists she mentored.

Early career 
Stone graduated from the University of Manitoba in 1985. In art school, she originally began as a painter, "but that didn't last long" (according to Stone). Many middle and late 20th century philosophers and artists whose work centers around the collision of art, science, and humanity inspired Stone. She began working on interactive pieces in 1989, after encouragement from Richard Dyck, a fellow Winnipeg, technologically-focused artist, and the piece Legacy was born. Legacy, finished in 1993, is a child's room, one wall representing a stereotypical girl and the other representing a stereotypical boy, exploring gender roles of young children. The viewer can interact with the installation through a computer game that cries out "Come play with me," begging for human interaction.

Work 
Since the early 1990s, Stone has focused almost exclusively on interactive, technologically based art forms, using technology to isolate and explore specific properties of the human experience. Notably, she has done work with "the misogynistic world of video games, the disciplinary effects of medical science, the stimulation of human intelligence and affect in robotics, and the visual modeling of protein molecules."

Her "most ambitious piece" (according to Robert Enright) is Imaginal Expression, which appeared in a featured exhibition at the Winnipeg Art Gallery in 2004. In this piece, she shaped parts of her own body (hair, skin, fingers) into protein molecules projected as moving images on a 9' x 48' screen. Stone sees Imaginal Expression as a visual form of potential for "genetic re-mapping and re-engineering."

Carnevale 3.0, finished 2002, mirrors human consciousness by taking pictures of viewers in the gallery that are either stored or "forgotten" as a way to simulate human memory. The robot figure is inspired by a picture of Stone, herself, as a young girl. This choice was very intentional, according to Stone, and attempts to works against the "image of women in cyber culture."

sentientBody, 1998, uses Stone's own disembodied breathing matched with images of water and sand "to both realize and dematerialize the existence of the body" (according to Enright).
Stone has been featured in numerous solo exhibitions as well many group exhibitions. She is also featured in six public collections in Canada and private collections throughout Canada and the United States.

Awards and recognitions
Stone was inducted into the Royal Canadian Academy of Arts in 2007. Carnevale 3.0 was recognized by Life 5.0, Art & Artificial Life International Competition, Fundación Telefónica in Madrid, Spain with an honorable mention. In 2015, she received a Governor General's Awards in Visual and Media Arts.

References

External links

1944 births
Living people
Canadian multimedia artists
University of Manitoba alumni
Canadian women artists
Canadian contemporary artists
Artists from Winnipeg
Governor General's Award in Visual and Media Arts winners
Members of the Royal Canadian Academy of Arts